The 6th Parliament of Ontario was in session from December 29, 1886, until April 26, 1890, just prior to the 1890 general election. The majority party was the Ontario Liberal Party  led by Oliver Mowat.

Jacob Baxter served as speaker for the assembly.

Notes

References 
A History of Ontario : its resources and development., Alexander Fraser
Members in Parliament 6

06
1886 establishments in Ontario
1890 disestablishments in Ontario